Steffen Büttner (born 2 November 1963) is a German former professional footballer who played as a defender.

Career
Büttner began his career with Dynamo Dresden, making his debut in 1984. He established himself in the Dynamo first team throughout the late 1980s, winning two East German titles, and two Cups. In 1990, he made three international appearances for East Germany, the first coming against the USA.

After reunification, Dynamo qualified for the Bundesliga. Büttner featured in the first season (1991–92), but his appearances were sporadic, and he left at the end of the season, to join lower league Union Berlin. After just over two years at Union, he returned to Dresden, joining Dresdner SC, where he played until 1999. He ended his career with three years across town, at FV Dresden 06.

References

External links

 
 
 

1963 births
Living people
German footballers
East German footballers
East Germany international footballers
Dynamo Dresden players
Dynamo Dresden II players
1. FC Union Berlin players
Dresdner SC players
Bundesliga players
DDR-Oberliga players
Association football defenders